Varun Unni is an Indian composer and singer. He made his film composing debut in 2012, with the Malayalam film Annum Innum Ennum. He has been predominantly composing for television commercials besides having sporadic music video releases.

Early life and career
Varun Unni was born on 15 July 1989 in Kochi, Kerala. He did his schooling at Chinmaya Vidyalaya, Vaduthala in Kochi and went on to graduate from engineering at Adi Shankara College of Engineering, Kalady.

Although devoid of any background in films, Varun's first priority was always film music. After training at Kalabhavan, he went on to work with bands like Highway Haze and Flying Squad. He lists Bob Marley and Eric Clapton as his greatest influences.

Film composing career 
Though his debut film bombed at the box office, Varun's debut work  "Ayyo" from Annum Innum Ennum was noticed.
His second film with the same team failed again at the box-office. He shifted focus to composing jingles for advertisement films and associated with famous brands like Chemmanur and MCR. In 2017, he was offered the Kannada film Kempegowda-2, a spin-off of Kempe Gowda, the Kannada remake of Singam. The film opened to a favourable response and Varun subsequently signed more films in Kannada, including Kongka Pass with the same team.

Music videos

Smile
In 2013, Varun produced a social cause album titled Smile featuring five singles by Shwetha Mohan as well as songs by upcoming singers Suchith Suresan and Yazin Nizar. It was released by the indie music label Tune4 Music.

Second Rain
In 2017, Varun Unni composed the music for the music movie Second Rain (Peyyum Mazhaye), produced and directed by Lijo Augustin, with cinematography by A. Kumaran of Thanga Magan fame.

The video also featured Arundhati, who starred in the Tamil film Saithan. The lyrics and video of the song narrate a tale of romance where rain acts as the predominant backdrop to important moments in the love story of a young couple. The video also features a short climactic fight sequence, for which Varun composed the background score.

The song was released via Muzik 247. The vocals were by Shweta Mohan and Ranjith, with programming by Ashwin Sivadas.

Upcoming work
As of 2019, Varun has signed films Malayalam, Telugu and Kannada languages. His first release of 2019 would be the Kannada film Kempe Gowda-2, for which he has composed film score and songs.

Film discography

References

Living people
Musicians from Kochi
Indian male playback singers
Film musicians from Kerala
Malayalam film score composers
1989 births
Indian male film score composers